Luke Metcalf (born 1 March 1999) is an Australian professional rugby league footballer who plays as a  or  for the New Zealand Warriors in the NRL. 

He previously played for the Cronulla-Sutherland Sharks in the National Rugby League.

Playing career

2021 & 2022
In round 20 of the 2021 NRL season, Metcalf made his debut for Cronulla against the Manly-Warringah Sea Eagles in the "Battle of the beaches" game which ended in a 22-40 defeat.
In round 23 against the Wests Tigers, Metcalf scored two tries for Cronulla in a 50-20 victory.
On 15 November 2021, the New Zealand Warriors announced they had signed Metcalf on a two-year deal commencing in 2023. Metcalf made only one appearance for Cronulla in the 2022 NRL season in round 25 against Newcastle scoring a try during the 38-16 victory.

Statistics

NRL
 Statistics are correct as of the end of the 2022 season

References

External links
Cronulla Sharks profile

1999 births
Living people
Australian rugby league players
Cronulla-Sutherland Sharks players
Rugby league halfbacks
Rugby league players from Coffs Harbour